Benjamin "Honey" Lott (March 18, 1925 – September 10, 1980) was an American Negro league outfielder in the 1940s.

A native of Newark, New Jersey, Lott attended East Side High School and Florida Normal & Industrial Institute. He played for the New York Black Yankees in 1948, and played minor league baseball into the 1950s with such clubs as the Tulsa Oilers and the Colorado Springs Sky Sox. Lott died in Newark in 1980 at age 55.

References

External links
 and Baseball-Reference Black Baseball Stats and Seamheads

1925 births
1980 deaths
New York Black Yankees players
Baseball outfielders
Baseball players from Newark, New Jersey
East Side High School (Newark, New Jersey) alumni
20th-century African-American sportspeople